USS Adder (Submarine Torpedo Boat No. 3), later renamed A-2, was one of seven s built for the United States Navy (USN) in the first decade of the 20th century.

Construction
Adder was laid down on 3 October 1900 at the Crescent Shipyard, Elizabethport, New Jersey, by Lewis Nixon, a subcontractor for the John P. Holland Torpedo Boat Company, New York City; launched on 22 July 1901; sponsored by Mrs. Jane S. Wainwright, wife of Rear Admiral Richard Wainwright.  Adder was commissioned on 12 January 1903 at the Holland Torpedo Boat Station at New Suffolk, New York with Ensign Frank L. Pinney in command.  She was the second submarine commissioned in the United States Navy after USS Holland (SS-1).

Design
The Plunger-class submarines were enlarged and improved versions of the preceding , the first submarine in the USN. They displaced  on the surface and  submerged. The Plunger-class boats had a crew of one officer and six enlisted men.

For surface running, they were powered by one  gasoline engine that drove the single propeller. When submerged the propeller was driven by a  electric motor. The boats could reach  on the surface and  underwater.

The Plunger-class boats were armed with one  torpedo tube in the bow. They carried two reloads, for a total of three torpedoes.

Service history
After initial experimental duty at the Naval Torpedo Station at Newport, Adder was towed to the Norfolk Naval Shipyard by the tug Peoria, arriving there on 4 December 1903. In January 1904, the submarine torpedo boat was assigned to the Reserve Torpedo Flotilla. Placed out of commission on 26 July 1909, Adder was loaded onto the collier , and was transported to the Philippines, arriving on 1 October.

Recommissioned on 10 February 1910, she was assigned to duty with the 1st Submarine Division, Asiatic Torpedo Fleet. Over almost a decade, the submarine torpedo boat operated from Cavite and Olongapo, principally in training and experimental work. During this time, she was renamed on 17 November 1911, becoming simply A-2 (Submarine Torpedo Boat No. 3).

World War I
During World War I, she carried out patrols off the entrance to Manila Bay, and around the island of Corregidor. Decommissioned on 12 December 1919, A-2 (assigned the alphanumeric hull number "SS-3" on 17 July 1920) was designated for use as a target on 24 September 1920. Sunk as a target in mid-January 1922, she was struck from the Naval Vessel Register on 16 January 1922.

Notes

References

External links
history.navy.mil: USS Adder Photos

hazegray.org: USS Adder
Crescent Shipyard Information on Lewis Nixon's Crescent Shipyard, location of John P. Holland's site of operations in Elizabethtown, New Jersey.

Adder 003
A-1
Ships built in Elizabeth, New Jersey
1901 ships
Ships sunk as targets
Maritime incidents in 1922